Huaying is a county-level city in the east of Sichuan province, China. It is administered by the prefecture-level city Guang'an. Its total population  is 360,000 and with 50000 in the central city district. The city tree is the small leafed banyan and the city flower is the azalea.

References

County-level cities in Sichuan